Pacifique Recording Studios is a mixing and recording studio based in North Hollywood, California that was launched by Joe, Ken, and Vic Deranteriassian in 1984.
In 1999, Pacifique installed its second SSL console, the 9000 J Series. In 2003, Pacifique housed two SSL K 9000 (96 input) consoles, which is still sought after by engineers and artists who prefer analog boards over digital ones. Pacifique has been featured in Billboard, Mix, and Audio magazines for its mixing and recording achievements over the past 25 years. The company sold to new ownership in late 2015.

List of gold/platinum albums recorded or mixed at Pacifique 

Trompe le Monde (Pixies, 1991)
Unforgettable… with Love (Natalie Cole, 1991)
Big Willie Style (Will Smith, 1997)
Men in Black: The Album (1997)
Never Say Never (Brandy, 1998)
Cosas del Amor (Enrique Iglesias, 1998)
Mi respuesta (Laura Pausini, 1998)
Christina Aguilera (Christina Aguilera, 1999)
The Writing's on the Wall (Destiny's Child,  1999)
On the 6 (Jennifer Lopez, 1999)
Amarte Es Un Placer (Luis Miguel, 1999)
It Was All a Dream (Dream, 2001)
Aaliyah (Aaliyah, 2001)
Karma (Tarkan, 2001)
In the Zone (Britney Spears, 2003)
Musicology (Prince, 2004)
Oral Fixation Vol. 2 (Shakira, 2005)
The Dutchess (Fergie, 2006)
Shock Value (Timbaland, 2007)
Curtis (50 Cent, 2007)
808s & Heartbreak (Kanye West, 2008)
Paper Trail (T.I., 2008)
Before I Self Destruct (50 Cent, 2009)
''Lemonade (Beyoncé, 2016)

Notable clients 

50 Cent
Aaliyah
Ameriie
André 3000
B2K
Beyoncé
The Black Eyed Peas
Bone Thugs-n-Harmony
Bow Wow
Boyz II Men
Britney Spears
Busta Rhymes
Cee Lo Green
Ciara
Chamillionaire
Chingy
Christina Aguilera
Common
D'Angelo
Destiny's Child
Dr. Dre
Duffy
Enrique Iglesias
Eric Benét
Erykah Badu
Eve
Fergie (singer)
The Game
G-Unit
Green Day
Immature
Jennifer Lopez
John Legend
JoJo
Joss Stone
Justin Timberlake
Juvenile
Kanye West
Kelis
Kelly Rowland
Laura Pausini
Lil Wayne
LL Cool J

Luis Miguel
Lupe Fiasco
Marques Houston
Mary J. Blige
Mos Def
Mýa
Nas
Natalie Cole
Natasha Bedingfield
Ne-Yo
New Boyz
98 Degrees
Omarion
Pussycat Dolls
Prince
Queen Latifah
Ray J
Redman
Rihanna
Rodney Jerkins
Ron Fair
Seal
Scott Storch
Shakira
Shania Twain
Sisqó
Snoop Dogg
Stevie Wonder
Soulja Boy
Tarkan
Tatyana Ali
Taylor Dayne
T.I.
Toni Braxton
Toto
Tricky Stewart
Warren G
will.i.am
Will Smith
Wyclef Jean
Xzibit
Young Jeezy

References 

Recording studios in California
1984 establishments in California